The 1977 NCAA Division III baseball tournament was played at the end of the 1977 NCAA Division III baseball season to determine the second national champion of college baseball at the NCAA Division III level. The tournament concluded with four teams competing at Pioneer Park in Marietta, Ohio, for the championship. Four regional tournaments were held to determine the participants in the World Series. Regional tournaments were contested in double-elimination format, with three regions consisting of six teams and one consisting of four, for a total of 22 teams participating in the tournament.

Bids
The 22 competing teams were:

Regionals

Bold indicates winner.

South Regional

Northeast Regional

West Regional

Mideast Regional

World Series

Participants

Bracket
Pioneer Park-Marietta, OH (Host: Marietta College)

See also
 1977 NCAA Division I baseball tournament
 1977 NCAA Division II baseball tournament
 1977 NAIA World Series

References

NCAA Division III tournament
NCAA Division III Baseball Tournament